Frank Lee Bare Sr. (September 13, 1930 – February 25, 2011) was an American gymnast and co-founder of the United States Gymnastics Federation, now called USA Gymnastics. Bare promoted development of nationwide gymnastics exhibition tours in the 1970s and helped launch the first American Cup meet in 1976.  He was also involved in the startup of the International Gymnastics Hall of Fame.

Bare was an NCAA gymnast at University of Illinois at Urbana–Champaign in the 1950s. At NCAA championships, he won a gold medal one year and a silver in another, both times in the pommel horse.

Bare's son, Frank Bare Jr., was an freestyle skier of the 1970s and 1980s.

References

1930 births
2011 deaths
American male artistic gymnasts
Illinois Fighting Illini men's gymnasts